Arikhankharer was a crown-prince of Kush (circa AD 15?).

Arikhankharer was the eldest son of Natakamani and Amanitore. While he was crown-prince the temple of Amun at Naqa was decorated. Arikhankharer is depicted on a slab now displayed at the Worcester Art Museum in Worcester, Mass. He is given the title pkrtr which means crown-prince.

Arikhankharer died fairly young and was succeeded as crown-prince by his brother Arikakahtani. According to Reisner, Shorkahor was likely buried in Pyramid 10 at Meroe (Bagrawiyah). In his tomb he was given the throne name Ankh-ke-re.

References

Kings of Kush
1st-century monarchs in Africa